Simo Nikolić (29 January 1941 – 9 April 2012) was a Croatian sailor. He competed for Yugoslavia at the 1968 and 1972 Summer Olympics. He became European Champion in 1966, runner-up in 1968, and bronze medallist in the 1967 World Championship of the Snipe class, in all cases as a crew of Anton Grego.

References

External links
 

1941 births
2012 deaths
Croatian male sailors (sport)
Olympic sailors of Yugoslavia
Yugoslav male sailors (sport)
Sailors at the 1968 Summer Olympics – Flying Dutchman
Sailors at the 1972 Summer Olympics – Flying Dutchman
Snipe class sailors
Sportspeople from Novi Sad